Wojciech of Jastrzębiec (c. 1362–1436) was a Polish mediaeval politician and religious leader. A bishop of Cracow and Poznań, he also held prominent posts at the court of the king Władysław II of Poland.

Initially a chancellor to king Jadwiga of Poland and one of the advisors to the king Władysław, on 26 April 1399 he was ordained an archbishop of Gniezno and hence Primate of Poland. However, he gave up that post on the king's insistence.

Wojciech authored numerous religious works and became the person to crown king Władysław III of Poland in the Wawel Cathedral on 25 July 1434.

References
Piotr Nitecki (2000): Biskupi Kościoła w Polsce w latach 965-1999: Słownik Biograficzny (Bishops in Poland 965-1999: biographical dictionary). Warsaw, Pax.
Grażyna Lichończak-Nurek (1999): Wojciech Jastrzębiec (ok. 1362-1436), duchowny i mąż stanu''

External links
 Virtual tour Gniezno Cathedral 
List of Primates of Poland 

1362 births
1436 deaths
Bishops of Poznań
15th-century Roman Catholic bishops in Poland
Bishops of Kraków
Archbishops of Gniezno
People in the Battle of Grunwald